Acalolepta cariosa is a species of beetle in the family Cerambycidae. It was described by Francis Polkinghorne Pascoe in 1866. It is known from Sumatra, Borneo and Malaysia.

References

Acalolepta
Beetles described in 1866